The black-breasted puffleg (Eriocnemis nigrivestis) is a species of hummingbird native to Ecuador. It is Critically Endangered, with no more than 250 individuals remaining in the wild.

Description
The species reaches a length of 8–9 cm. It is sexually dimorphic, with the male having black upper- and underparts, dark blue tail coverts, and a violet-blue throat and undertail-coverts. The female is bronze-green above, bluish-green on rump and uppertail-coverts, golden-green underparts and a pale blue chin. Both sexes have a straight black bill, a forked tail and white pufflegs, from which the common name is derived.

There is no characteristic vocalization; the species is generally quite silent, but may on occasion emit a monotonous and metallic "tseet tseet tseet" when it flies away.

Distribution and habitat
The black-breasted puffleg is endemic to north-western Ecuador, where it currently appears restricted to the ridge crests of the Pichincha Volcano, the Cordillera de Toisán, Esmeraldas and Imbabura. Based on possible sightings in 1983 and 2010, it may still occur on Atacazo. Unconfirmed sightings exist for several other locations. It may be seen on the Reserva Yanacocha, just outside of Quito, managed by the Fundación Jocotoco. The species occurs in humid and wet cloud and montane forest at altitudes of 1,700-3,500 m.

Ecology

Like most hummingbirds, the species primarily feeds on nectar and insects. It follows a seasonally changing feeding pattern based on available blooms (mostly ericas and fuchsias). Areas of forest with a high number of nectar-containing flowers will be heavily defended against other hummingbirds.

Reproduction
In breeding season, the male performs short display flights in front of the female. The species is not monogamous, and males can copulate with several females in the same breeding season. The construction of the nest, the incubation and the care of the chicks are the responsibility of the female. The nest consists of moss and fibers, together with some animal fur and feathers. Some nests are built with spiders webs and others sticky materials, which allow the nest to stretch itself to twice its original size as the chicks grow. It is normally placed on low horizontal branches.

Two white eggs are usually incubated. The mother feeds them (by regurgitating) mostly on insects, as nectar does not contain enough protein to sustain chick growth. A nesting female can catch up to 2,000 insects per day. The chicks leave the nest after 20 days. The birds are altitudinal migrants, generally being found at altitudes of 2850–3500 m between April and September, but remaining above 3100 m during the breeding season from November to February.

Habitat selection
The black-breasted puffleg's response to microhabitats variations is extremely sensitive. It has been suggested that the species is under competitive disadvantage for the same ecological niche with others hummingbird species, specifically the Gorgeted sunangel, and that avoidance of forest borders is used to mitigate the stress imposed by the seasonal altitudinal migrations.

Conservation
The species is classified as Endangered by the IUCN based on its restricted range and extremely low population numbers. A 2015 assessment estimated a total number of 210-268 individuals (of which roughly 140-180 would be adults), and the population is believed to have shrunk by 10-20% per decade in the recent past. Although the black-breasted puffleg has recently been rediscovered in small populations outside its main range on the Pichincha volcano, its total area of occurrence is estimated as no larger than 80 km2. Of the habitat in its original range, 93-97% are considered to have been degraded or destroyed by agricultural expansion, logging and cattle grazing, and these practices remain the main threats to the species, together with natural and human-induced fires.

A primary source of habitat loss has been the construction of the Oleoducto de Crudos Pesados (OCP) for oil transportation, a route that was established through one of the last remnants of forest.

On June 23, 2005, the Municipality of Quito adopted the black-breasted puffleg as the emblem of the capital city.

References

External links
Black Breasted Puffleg
BirdLife Species Factsheet
Black-breasted puffleg videos on the Internet Bird Collection
Photo-High Res; Article mindobirds.com
Black-breasted puffleg photo gallery VIREO Photo-High Res

black-breasted puffleg
Birds of the Ecuadorian Andes
Endemic birds of Ecuador
Critically endangered animals
Critically endangered biota of South America
black-breasted puffleg
black-breasted puffleg